Charles MacLeod may refer to:
Charles Campbell MacLeod (1858–1936), chairman of the National Bank of India and of the Imperial Tea Company
Sir Charles Henry MacLeod, 3rd Baronet (1924–2012), of the MacLeod baronets
Charles MacLeod, former member of UK band of Seafood